is a Japanese publishing company known as a specialist legal publisher. It has been run by the Egusa family since its foundation in 1877, headquartered in Kanda-Jinbōchō, Tokyo.

References

External links 

 Yuhikaku Publishing

Publishing companies established in 1877
Book publishing companies in Tokyo
Magazine publishing companies in Tokyo
Mass media companies based in Tokyo
1877 establishments in Japan